Invisible People may refer to:

"Invisible People" (album), a 2020 album by Chicano Batman
Invisible People (organization), an American non-profit organization
Invisible People, a 1993 graphic novel by Will Eisner
"Invisible People", an Icehouse song from the album Big Wheel
"Invisible People", a 2005 single by The Wallstones
"Invisible People", an Ill Niño song from the album Epidemia
"Invisible People", a Peter, Paul and Mary song from the album In These Times

See also
Invisible Men, a 1983 album by Anthony Phillips
 Invisible Women (disambiguation)
 Invisible (disambiguation)